St. Marks is a city in Wakulla County, Florida, United States. It is part of the Tallahassee metropolitan area. The population was 293 at the 2010 census. As of 2018, the population estimated by the U.S. Census Bureau is 319.

Geography

Demographics

St. Marks first appeared in the 1850 U.S. census with a total population of 189.

2020 census

As of the 2020 United States census, there were 274 people, 167 households, and 140 families residing in the city.

2000 census
As of the census of 2000, there were 272 people, 137 households, and 79 families residing in the city. The racial makeup of the city was 93.75% White, 2.57% African American, 0.74% Native American, 0.37% Asian, 1.10% from other races, and 1.47% from two or more races. Hispanic or Latino of any race were 0.37% of the population.

There were 137 households, out of which 16.1% had children under the age of 18 living with them, 43.1% were married couples living together, 9.5% had a female householder with no husband present, and 42.3% were non-families. 36.5% of all households were made up of individuals, and 8.8% had someone living alone who was 65 years of age or older.  The average household size was 1.99 and the average family size was 2.56.

In the city, the population was spread out, with 15.8% under the age of 18, 7.4% from 18 to 24, 27.6% from 25 to 44, 31.6% from 45 to 64, and 17.6% who were 65 years of age or older.  The median age was 44 years. For every 100 females, there were 104.5 males.  For every 100 females age 18 and over, there were 110.1 males.

The median income for a household in the city was $25,156, and the median income for a family was $36,250. Males had a median income of $25,234 versus $21,458 for females. The per capita income for the city was $14,994.  About 19.1% of families and 19.5% of the population were below the poverty line, including 27.3% of those under the age of eighteen and 6.7% of those 65 or over.

On July 10, 2005, the storm surge associated with Hurricane Dennis severely flooded the town, causing major damage to local businesses and homes.

History

Originally known as San Marcos de Apalache and centered on a Spanish fort, this town was founded by the Spanish in the 17th century in what was then Spanish Florida. There was a trading post of Panton, Leslie & Company in the late 18th century. A long time has passed since St. Marks last had appreciable importance, but this place on Apalachee Bay in Florida's Big Bend is a very old and historic Gulf port. Fortifications built here by the Spanish in the 17th century, and rebuilt several times, provided the venue for force of arms repeatedly up through the American Civil War.

In the best-known incident, Andrew Jackson, in his incursion into Spanish Florida in 1818, executed British nationals Robert Chrystie Ambrister and Alexander George Arbuthnot at the old fort, as well as the Muscogee ("Creek") religious leader called Francis the Prophet. This nearly embroiled the United States in international strife. San Marcos de Apalache Historic State Park interprets the site of the old fort.

Today's St. Marks evidently has its roots in American commercial activity that took hold beneath the walls of the fort upon acquisition of Spanish Florida by the U.S. in 1821—before the settlement moved slightly up the St. Marks River to the present position. Various articles in publications like Florida Historical Quarterly relate how the fort site later held a government "naval" hospital to meet yellow fever emergencies in the merchant marine. And just afterward Confederate batteries were established on the site in the Civil War. Their earthworks remain and are interpreted in the historic state park. But the site also exhibits old Spanish stonework, and not far away (though inaccessible), just down St. Marks River  are shallow Spanish quarries where this limestone was evidently obtained in the 1730s.

Limestone quarried here by the Spanish helped to make the St. Marks Light lighthouse, constructed about 1830 by the U.S. government. The lighthouse stands, after a couple of reconstructions, at the mouth of the river six miles from town and accessible by road. The lighthouse is, like San Marcos de Apalache, on the National Register of Historic Places.

St. Marks was a seaport for all of Middle Florida and lower Georgia during this early period. Ellen Call Long, on her way to Tallahassee, described the port about 1830 as "a quaint little village, amphibious-like, consisting of a few dwelling houses, stores, etc., mostly built on stilts or piles, as if ready to launch when wind or tide prevailed."

A railroad often cited as Florida's first connected the port of St. Marks with the territorial capital, Tallahassee, some 20 miles inland. The line, the Tallahassee Railroad, was constructed about 1836, and until the Civil War it served in the export of Middle Florida's cotton through St. Marks.

The capacity of the St. Marks port was limited, and it was surpassed in the 19th century by the larger port of Apalachicola, served by the Thomasville, Tallahassee and Gulf Railroad via Carrabelle, Florida.

The now-abandoned rail line serves as Tallahassee-St. Marks Historic Railroad State Trail, a paved  bicycle and equestrian trail terminating at the St. Marks waterfront.

This section of the coast was damaged by the big storm surge of Hurricane Dennis in 2005. As on other occasions in its history, St. Marks was flooded badly with saltwater.

See also

Apalachee Bay
San Marcos de Apalache Historic State Park
St. Marks Light
St. Marks River
St. Marks National Wildlife Refuge
Tallahassee-St. Marks Historic Railroad State Trail
Edward Ball Wakulla Springs State Park
Wakulla River

References

External links

Cities in Wakulla County, Florida
Tallahassee metropolitan area
Cities in Florida
Trading posts in the United States